Deborah Newcomb (born March 8, 1954) is a Democratic politician who most recently served in the Ohio House of Representatives from 2008 to 2010.  A representative for one and one half terms, Newcomb lost reelection in 2010 to Casey Kozlowski by 42 votes.

References

External links
Debbie Newcomb for State Representative official campaign site
The Ohio Ladies' Gallery: Deborah Newcomb

1954 births
Living people
Democratic Party members of the Ohio House of Representatives
Women state legislators in Ohio
People from Conneaut, Ohio
21st-century American politicians
21st-century American women politicians